Leslie Kets (born 3 April 1959) is a South African cricketer. He played in twelve first-class and four List A matches for Boland in 1982/83 and 1985/86.

See also
 List of Boland representative cricketers

References

External links
 

1959 births
Living people
South African cricketers
Boland cricketers
Cricketers from Johannesburg